In anatomy, a medullary ray  (Ferrein's pyramid) is the middle part of a cortical lobule (or renal lobule). Each consists of a group of nephrons in the renal cortex. Their name is potentially misleading, as "medullary" refers to their destination, not their location. They travel perpendicular to the capsule, and extend from the cortex to the medulla. They may be visualised during urography.

Additional Images

References

External links 
  — "Urinary System: kidney, H&E, cortex and medullary ray"
  — "Urinary System: neonatal kidney"
 

Kidney anatomy